Communauté urbaine Limoges Métropole is the communauté urbaine, an intercommunal structure, centred on the city of Limoges. It is located in the Haute-Vienne department, in the Nouvelle-Aquitaine region, southwestern France. It was created in November 2002 as the Communauté d'agglomération Limoges Métropole, which was transformed into a communauté urbaine on 1 January 2019. Its area is 520.6 km2. Its population was 207,385 in 2018, of which 131,479 in Limoges proper.

Composition
The communauté d'agglomération consists of the following 20 communes:

Aureil
Boisseuil
Bonnac-la-Côte
Chaptelat
Condat-sur-Vienne
Couzeix
Eyjeaux
Feytiat
Isle
Limoges
Le Palais-sur-Vienne
Panazol
Peyrilhac
Rilhac-Rancon
Saint-Gence
Saint-Just-le-Martel
Solignac
Verneuil-sur-Vienne
Veyrac
Le Vigen

References

Limoges
Limoges
Limoges